

The Shavrov Sh-3 was a Soviet project for a single-engined light amphibious aircraft designed by Vadim Shavrov for the transport role. The programme was abandoned as the prototype was nearing completion.

Specifications

See also

References

Notes

Bibliography

1930s Soviet civil utility aircraft
Floatplanes
Sh-3
Single-engined tractor aircraft
Amphibious aircraft
Low-wing aircraft